The Discourse Unit is an international research group that currently has its main base at the University of Manchester in the United Kingdom. It has been one of the most important focal points for the development of critical work in psychology and in other social sciences concerned with questions of subjectivity and politics. The term "discourse" is used as a cover-all term for political studies of individual subjectivity that draw on feminism, Marxism, post-structuralism and psychoanalysis. In 2003, Ian Parker produced a document for the Discourse Unit that outlines the way that researchers in the group draw on these four theoretical resources. There is disagreement within the research group over the accuracy of this document.

The centre runs short courses, including "Discursive Practice" (which has had an important impact on the development of critical discourse analysis inside and outside the UK) and "Critical Psychology". Collective action research and publication projects have been organized by Erica Burman. These courses have included postgraduate students and practitioners from the UK and overseas working in clinical, educational and occupational psychology. Graduates of courses run by the Discourse Unit now work in a number of countries, including Brazil, Canada, China, Portugal, Germany, Greece, Sweden, South Africa, Spain and the United States. There are regular closed meetings of the Discourse Unit in Manchester to discuss ongoing research projects, and open meetings to provide a forum for debate about methodological, theoretical and political issues in psychology and the human sciences.

The founders of the Discourse Unit describe the group's name as a "necessary mistake", and would prefer another name, if it were being founded now.

References

External links 
 

Psychology organisations based in the United Kingdom